This is a list of educational software that is computer software whose primary purpose is teaching or self-learning.

Educational software by subject

Anatomy
 3D Indiana
 Bodyworks Voyager – Mission in Anatomy
 Primal Pictures
 Visible Human Project

Chemistry
 Aqion - simulates water chemistry

Children's software
 Bobo Explores Light
 ClueFinders titles
 Delta Drawing
 Edmark
 Fun School titles
 GCompris - free software (GPL)
 Gold Series
 JumpStart titles
 Kiwaka
 KidPix
 Lola Panda
 Museum Madness
 Ozzie series
 Reader Rabbit titles
 Tux Paint - free software (GPL)
 Zoombinis titles

Computer science
 JFLAP - Java Formal language and Automata Package

Cryptography
 CrypTool - illustrates cryptographic and cryptanalytic concepts

Dictionaries and reference

 Britannica
 Encarta
 Encyclopædia Britannica Ultimate Reference Suite

Geography and Astronomy 

 Cartopedia: The Ultimate World Reference Atlas
 Celestia
 Google Earth - (proprietary license)
 Gravit - a free (GPL) Newtonian gravity simulator
 KGeography
 KStars
 NASA World Wind - free software (NASA open source)
 Stellarium
 Swamp Gas Visits the United States of America - a game that teaches geography to children
 Where is Carmen Sandiego? game series
 WorldWide Telescope - a freeware from Microsoft

Health
 TeachAids

History

 Encyclopedia Encarta Timeline
 Euratlas

 Back in Time (iPad)
 Balance of Power
 Lemonade Stand
 Number Munchers
 Odell Lake
 Spellevator
 Windfall: The Oil Crisis Game
 Word Munchers

Literacy
 Accelerated Reader
 AutoTutor
 Compu-Read
 DISTAR

Managed learning environments

 ATutor (GPL)
 Blackboard Inc.
 Chamilo
 Claroline
 eCollege
 eFront (CPAL)
 Fle3 (GPL)
 GCompris (GPL)
 Google Classroom
 ILIAS (GPL)
 Kannu
 LON-CAPA - free software (GPL)
 Moodle - free software (GPL)
 OLAT - free software
 Renaissance Place
 Sakai Project - free software
 WebAssign

Mathematics

 Accelerated Math
 Cantor (software)
 Compu-Math: Fractions
 DrGeo
 Geogebra
 The Geometer's Sketchpad
 Maple
 Matlab / GNU Octave
 Mathematica
 Matheass
 Math Blaster
 Microsoft Mathematics
 RekenTest
 MathFacts in a Flash
 SAGE - free software (GPL)
 TK Solver
 Tux, of Math Command- free software (GPL)

Music

 Comparison of music education software
 EarMaster
 Yousician
 MuseScore
 Syntorial

Programming

 BlueJ
 Hackety Hack
 Racket
 RoboMind
 Scratch
 Swift Playgrounds

Science
 Betty's Brain
 Science Sleuths

Simulation

Simulation games

 Caesar titles
 Capitalism
 Civilization
 The Oregon Trail
 Sid Meier's Colonization
 SimCity
 Zoo Tycoon

Spaced Repetition
 Anki
 Memrise
 SuperMemo
 Synap
 Mnemosyne

Touch-Typing Instruction
 Mavis Beacon Teaches Typing
 Mario Teaches Typing
 Smorball
 Tux Typing - free software (GPL)

Visual Learning and Mind Mapping

 ConceptDraw MINDMAP
 Freemind - free software (GPL)
 Perception
 SpicyNodes

Notable brands and suppliers of educational software
 Dorling Kindersley
 Knowledge Adventure
 The Learning Company
 Promethean World
 Renaissance Learning
 Riverdeep
 SMART Technologies
 RM plc
 Unplag

Historical brands and suppliers
 Brøderbund (now part of The Learning Company)
 Creative Wonders (now part of the Learning Company)
 Davidson & Associates (merged with Knowledge Adventure)
 Edu-Ware
 MECC

References

 
Educational video games
Educational